Tula orthohantavirus, formerly Tula virus, (TULV) is a single-stranded, negative-sense RNA virus species of orthohantavirus first isolated from a European common vole (Microtus arvalis) found in Central Russia. It causes Hantavirus hemorrhagic fever with renal syndrome. The Microtus species are also found in North America, Europe, Scandinavia, Slovenia, Asia, and Western Russia. Human cases of Tula orthohantavirus have also been reported in Switzerland and Germany.

See also
Sweating sickness

References

External links
Sloan Science and Film / Short Films / Muerto Canyon by Jen Peel 29 minutes

 CDC's Hantavirus Technical Information Index page
 Viralzone: Hantavirus
 Virus Pathogen Database and Analysis Resource (ViPR): Bunyaviridae
 Occurrences and deaths in North and South America

Viral diseases
Hantaviridae
Hemorrhagic fevers
Rodent-carried diseases